José Roberto "Pepe" Espinosa (born 1948 in Escuinapa, Sinaloa - 2007) was a Mexican commentator for American football at Fox Sports Latin America.

Pepe Espinosa, as he was better known, had a Chemical Engineering degree at Instituto Politécnico Nacional and was also an American football player for the team of that institution. He started in sports media in Mexican television at Imevision (now TV Azteca) in 1976 working along with José Ramón Fernández where developed as one of the best NFL commentators Mexico has ever had. 

He also participated commenting NBA (80's-2004), NHL (1997–98 and 1998-99 seasons) and College Football (BCS) games while in TV Azteca, as well as the opening and closing ceremonies for the Olympic Games from Seoul 1988, Barcelona 1992, Atlanta 1996 and Sydney 2000 and Winter Olympics from Nagano 1998 and Salt Lake 2002.

Pepe was a great defender of the sport culture, it gave messages in its narrations towards young people (his "brothers"), to direct them towards a total culture of the sport, so that it advised to them to train very hard, to go to the gyms, to eat nutritious, to study in the school, to respect to its teachers and trainers. It always alerted on the complications that emerged when having bad companies and as some professional players decreased their races by this fact.

In 2004, Pepe Espinosa left TV Azteca after 28 years to join Fox Sports Latin America, where on January 16, 2007, he received a recognition for his 30 years transmitting the Super Bowl for Hispanic audience.

On July 4, 2007, Espinosa died due to a pneumonia provoked by a lymphatic cancer which he was already some years fighting against.

Last Games Called

NBA: Game 5 2004 NBA Finals (TV Azteca)

NFL: Super Bowl XLI (Fox Sports)

College Football: 2007 BCS National Championship Game (Fox Sports)

Olympic Hockey: 2002 ice hockey Gold Medal Game (TV Azteca)

NHL: 1999 Stanley Cup Playoffs (TV Azteca)

References

External links
Article in Fox Sports Latin America
Article in Mexican newspaper El Universal
Fox Sports celebra la participación #30 de Pepe Espinosa en Super Bowls

1948 births
Sportspeople from Sinaloa
National Football League announcers
National Basketball Association broadcasters
2007 deaths
National Hockey League broadcasters
College football announcers
People from Escuinapa de Hidalgo
Instituto Politécnico Nacional alumni